Homeobox Protein HB24 is a protein that in humans is encoded by the HLX gene.

Role in development 

Hlx belongs to the class of homeobox transcription factors, initially cloned from a B-lymphocyte cell line. Targeted knockout of the gene has demonstrated its vital role in liver and gut organogenesis. Its expression is first noticed in embryonic day 9.5 (E9.5) in the splanchnic mesoderm caudal to the level of the heart and foregut pocket, and in the branchial arches. Around E10- E12.5, the expression becomes more prominent in the mesenchyme of the visceral organs of the gut such as liver, intestines and gall bladder. Hlx is essential for liver and gut expansion, but not for onset of their development. Heterozygous knockouts of Hlx (Hlx +/−) are normal whereas homozygous knockouts (Hlx −/–) develop severe hypoplasia of the liver and gut along with anaemia. Hlx controls the epithelial-mesenchymal interaction necessary for liver and gut expansion. At E8.0, the primary liver bud is formed from the midgut endoderm in response to signals from the cardiogenic mesoderm. This is followed by signals from the septum transversum that induce epithelial-mesenchymal transition in the hepatic progenitors of the gut endoderm. In a third stage, these signaling factors induce the liver endoderm to undergo proliferation and form liver cords. The same factor controls gut proliferation, and Hlx governs its expression. Although these mice develop anaemia, it is likely due to insufficient support from the liver in producing matrix component needed for hematopoiesis rather than an intrinsic defect in the hematopoietic cells.

References

Further reading

External links 
 

Transcription factors